Clio is the muse of history in Greek mythology.

Clio may also refer to:

Mythology
 Clio (mythology), various women in Greek mythology

Places

United States
 Clio, Alabama, a city
 Clio, California, a census-designated place
 Clio, Iowa, a city
 Clio, Louisiana, an unincorporated community
 Clio, Michigan, a city
 Clio, South Carolina, a town
 Clio, West Virginia, an unincorporated community

Elsewhere
 Clio Bay, Lavoisier Island, Antarctica
 Clio Glacier, Scott Coast, Antarctica
 Clio Channel, between Turnour and West Cracroft Islands, British Columbia, Canada

People
 Clio Barnard (born 1965), British film director 
 Clio Maria Bittoni (born 1934), Italian jurist
 Clio Hinton Bracken (1870–1925), American sculptor
 Clio Goldsmith (born 1957), French actress
 Clio Gould, English violinist and leader of the Royal Philharmonic Orchestra
 Clio Lloyd (1864–1921), American Chief Clerk of the California Assembly and newspaper publisher
 Leslie Clio (born 1986), German singer, songwriter, music video director and producer
 Thomas 'Clio' Rickman (1760–1834), Quaker writer and Headstrong Club member

Science and technology
 CLIO (Cryogenic Laser Interferometer Observatory), a gravitational wave detector prototype
 Clio (gastropod), a genus of sea snails
 Vadem Clio, a handheld PC
 Clio, code name of the HTC Shift, an ultra-mobile PC released in 2008

Ships
 , three Royal Navy ships
 Italian ship Clio, three Italian Navy ships
 Clio (barque), a 19th-century sailing ship
 , a German cargo ship built in 1939

Other uses
 Clio (Hendrik Goltzius), a 1592 engraving
 Clio Art Fair, a contemporary art fair staged bi-annually in New York City and Los Angeles
 Clio Awards, an award for advertising, design, and communication
 Clio Cosmetics, a Korea cosmetics company
 Clio (software company), a legal technology company
 Renault Clio, a French car
 Honda Clio, a sales distribution channel for Honda cars
 Clio Area School District, a public school district in Michigan, United States, including the city of Clio

See also
 Cleo (disambiguation)
 Klio (disambiguation)
 Clyo, Georgia
 Clio-Danae Othoneou (born 1979), Greek actress and musician
 Kleio: A Journal of Historical Studies from Africa

Feminine given names